Xirovouni is a former municipality in the Arta regional unit, Epirus, Greece. Since the 2011 local government reform it is part of the municipality Arta, of which it is a municipal unit. The municipal unit has an area of 123.634 km2. Population 3,184 (2011). The seat of the municipality was in Ammotopos.

References

Populated places in Arta (regional unit)